Orphic Signs is the second studio album by the technical death metal band Desecravity. It was released on November 15 of 2014 on Willowtip Records.

Track listing

Credits
 Yuichi Kudo - Drums
 Daisuke Ichiboshi - Bass
 Shogo Tokita - Vocals/guitars

2014 albums
Desecravity albums